Sander Gliboff is a professor of History and Philosophy of Science at Indiana University. Gliboff earned a B.S. in biology from Cornell University in 1978, an M.A. at the University of North Carolina in 1981, and at Johns Hopkins University earned an M.A. in 1997 and a Ph.D. in 2001.

In 1999 his article, "Gregor Mendel and the Laws of Evolution," received the Ivan Slade Prize from The British Society for the History of Science.

Publications
"Gregor Mendel and the Laws of Evolution", History of Science, Volume 37, Part 2, Number 116, June 1999: 217-235.
"The Case of Paul Kammerer: Evolution and Experimentation in the Early 20th Century," Journal of the History of Biology, 2006.
"Evolution, Revolution, and Reform in Vienna: Franz Unger's Ideas on Descent and Their Post-1848," Journal of the History of Biology, 1998.
"HG Bronn and the History of Nature," Journal of the History of Biology, 2007.

References

External links
Sander Gliboff Faculty page

Historians of Germany
21st-century American historians
American male non-fiction writers
Cornell University alumni
Johns Hopkins University alumni
Living people
Indiana University faculty
University of North Carolina at Chapel Hill alumni
Year of birth missing (living people)
21st-century American male writers